is a platform game sequel to the 1983 Namco/Midway arcade game Mappy. It was released for the Family Computer in Japan only in 1989.

Plot
The player controls the son of Mappy who wants a wife but she will not marry him until Mappy can become a provider for his family. At the end of each level, there is a slot machine. Pulling the lever to the slot machine may allow the player to earn extra lives, items, gain or lose money. To receive it, the player must win a mini game first. After the mini-games, players access a shop, where they can buy various things with the money that they find during the game.

Gameplay
The game is a 2D platformer, the player must reach the end of the levels while avoiding various obstacles and enemies. The character is controlled with two buttons: a jump button and an attack button. While in mid-air, repeatedly pressing the jump button will make the character briefly hover and slow its descent. The attack button (a short-ranged kick) can be used to defeat enemies, open treasure chests, or remove breakable blocks.

The player can find various collectables inside the levels. Most of them are treasures (either 100-Yen coins found on the overworld or more valuable items found inside some chests) which increase the players wealth and can be spent in a shop at the end of each level on various furnitures to embellish the character's home. The other chest items are power-ups which can either give the player a temporary speed boost, temporary invincibility, an extra life, or retrieve some health.

The player possesses a health bar and a set amount of lives. If the character is hit, it will lose a hit point, be sent rolling backward a sizable amount and will lose a bag of money (that can be retrieved). When the character's health reaches 0, the player loses a life and is sent back at the beginning of the level. When the player has no more lives, the game is over.

Legacy
Mappy Kids was re-released on a cartridge for the Evercade in 2020. It was one of the few games that were released through Mappy Franchise.

References

External links
 Mappy Kids at GameFAQs
 

1989 video games
Japan-exclusive video games
Mappy
Namco games
Nintendo Entertainment System games
Nintendo Entertainment System-only games
Video games about mice and rats
Video games developed in Japan